CF Fairview Park (commonly known as Fairview Park Mall) is a large shopping mall of 120 stores in Kitchener, Ontario, Canada, owned and managed by Cadillac Fairview. Anchor stores are Hudson's Bay and Walmart, with one large anchor space, last occupied by Sears, divided into multiple stores including Winners, Sport Chek, Mark's, and a RBC branch which opened in 2021, with the rest of vacant space planned for redevelopment in the future.

Kingsway Drive bounds CF Fairview Park to the north, Wilson Avenue to the west, Fairway Road to the south, and Highway 8 to the east. Its presence over the years has turned Fairway Road into a major commercial strip.

The mall is also a significant public transit hub in Waterloo Region. Fairway station, located just west of the mall, is the terminus for many Grand River Transit bus routes as well as the southern terminal of the Ion rapid transit system, which recently started operating in June 2019.

History
Fairview Park opened in 1966 in the Parkway neighbourhood of the recently expanded City of Kitchener. A Simpsons-Sears department store had opened in August 1965, predating the mall's opening by a year, with the rest of the mall being constructed around it.

The initial anchors were Simpsons-Sears at the south end and a Zehrs supermarket at the north. A new wing with Woolco was added on the east in the early 1970s along with 20 stores, and Simpsons on the west was added in the early 1980s along with 40 more stores. In the time since, Simpsons-Sears has become Sears, Woolco was converted to a Walmart, and Simpsons became The Bay. The small Zehrs supermarket had been located facing Kingsway Drive but moved to an outdoor plaza on Weber Street on the other side of Highway 8 (occupying the space of the former "HiWay Market" supermarket). Its area was redeveloped, partially into the current food court and partially into a PharmaPlus location (which later closed).

From early 2007 to that summer, the mall underwent a major $33.4-million redevelopment. This renovation included a new food court and interiors, including high ceilings. The parking lot was also refurbished. It was the first major renovation since 1986.

Anchors
 Hudson's Bay
 Walmart Supercentre 
 Winners
 Sport Chek
 Mark's
 H&M (Opning May 2023)
 Urban Behavior
 Linen Chest
 Cineplex Cinemas and VIP
 Indigo Books and Music
 Party City

Former anchors
 Sears (divided into Winners, Sport Chek, Mark's, and a RBC branch)
 Forever 21 (now Urban Behavior)
 Gap/Gap Kids (converting to H&M)
 Simpsons (converted to Hudson's Bay)
 Woolco (converted to Walmart, now a Walmart Supercentre)

Food Court 
Fairview Park Mall has a large food court with various multicultural options ranging from American fast food to East Asian Cuisine. Notable restaurants include KFC, A&W, Famous Wok, Tim Horton's, Subway, and Bourbon Street Grill. Stand-alone restaurants include Jack Astor's and PI CO. Pizza Bar.

Area/Location 
Fairview Park Mall is located on Fairway road near the neighbourhoods of Traynor/Vanier and Centreville, a 5-minute drive from downtown Kitchener, Ontario. With a population of 14,000, it is one of the largest neighbourhoods in the Region.

Transit Terminal
Fairview Park Mall is also home to a central transit terminal. A bus terminal was located beside the southwest entrance to the Hudson's Bay store. This facility operated as a significant hub for Grand River Transit (GRT), with most of the routes served terminating there. The Region's Ion rapid transit system now services this area as well, at the Fairway station, which has its associated bus connections; when that station came online in June 2019, the existing terminal closed.

The Traynor/Vanier neighbourhood is home to many new immigrants and working-class people of Kitchener. Many of them use the bus regularly. This is an essential asset to the community in which the mall is located.

Bus routes essential from the Fairview neighbourhood reach as far as Southern Cambridge and Northern Waterloo are the epicentre of transportation in the Tri-Cities.

References

Shopping malls established in 1966
Shopping malls in Kitchener, Ontario
Tourist attractions in Kitchener, Ontario
Cadillac Fairview
1966 establishments in Ontario